Greenwood, also known as the Estill-Parrish House, is a historic home located near Fayette, Howard County, Missouri, United States.  It was built in 1864, and is a two-story, double pile, Greek Revival style brick dwelling with a two-story rear wing with an arcaded wooden gallery porch.  It features fine interior woodwork.  Also on the property are the contributing frame meat house, a single-cell slave house, a double-cell slave house, an ice house, and the White Hall School, a one-room frame school house built in 1860.

It was listed on the National Register of Historic Places in 1983.

References

One-room schoolhouses in Missouri
Houses on the National Register of Historic Places in Missouri
Greek Revival houses in Missouri
Houses completed in 1864
Buildings and structures in Howard County, Missouri
National Register of Historic Places in Howard County, Missouri